Kenneth Raymond Miller (born July 14, 1948) is an American cell biologist, molecular biologist, and former biology professor. Miller's primary research focus is the structure and function of cell membranes, especially chloroplast thylakoid membranes. Miller is a co-author of a major introductory college and high school biology textbook published by Prentice Hall since 1990. Miller, who is Roman Catholic, is opposed to creationism, including the intelligent design (ID) movement.  He has written three books on the subject: Finding Darwin's God, Only a Theory, and The Human Instinct. Miller has received the Laetare Medal at the University of Notre Dame. In 2017, he received the inaugural St. Albert Award from the Society of Catholic Scientists.

Biography
Miller graduated from Rahway High School in Rahway, New Jersey, and then received his Sc.B. in biology in 1970 from Brown University. He earned his Ph.D. in biology from the University of Colorado at Boulder in 1974. From 1974 to 1980, he taught at Harvard University.

Research 
His research involves problems of structure and function in biological membranes,  especially chloroplast thylakoid membranes, often involving electron microscopy.

Science advocacy
Miller has voiced his support for what he calls "pro-science" candidates in politics. He has campaigned for school board and education candidates who support the teaching of evolution in Kansas and Ohio. In the science community, he has sought to elevate the understanding of scientists of the roots of the creationist movement, and to encourage the popularization of scientific concepts.

Miller has appeared in court as a witness, and on panels debating the teaching of intelligent design in schools. In 2002, the Ohio State Board of Education held a public debate between two scientists, including Miller, and two proponents of intelligent design.

He testified for the plaintiffs, but only as a fact witness (not as an expert), in Selman v. Cobb County, testing the legality of stickers calling evolution a "theory, not a fact" that were placed on the biology textbook Miller authored. In 2005, the judge ruled that the stickers violated the Establishment Clause of the First Amendment to the United States Constitution. This decision was vacated on appeal because of missing records of the previous trial. The case was remanded for additional evidentiary inquiry and new findings, and a list of factual issues that the court would probably want to address included as item 15 a reference to Miller's testimony regarding "the colloquial or popular understanding of the term [theory]" and the suggested question as to whether he has any qualifications to testify as an expert on the popular meaning of the word "theory". The case was remanded back to the lower court and was eventually settled out of court.

Miller was also the plaintiff's lead expert witness in the 2004-2005 Kitzmiller v. Dover Area School District case, challenging the school board's mandate to incorporate intelligent design into the curriculum. The judge in that case also ruled decisively in favor of the plaintiffs.

He spoke at the Skeptics Society's Origins Conference in October 2008, and at the Veritas Forum on topics such as the relationship between science and religion and the existence of God.

Miller has appeared on the Comedy Central television show The Colbert Report,  and has made many appearances on C-SPAN debating proponents of creationism and intelligent design.  He has debated several supporters of intelligent design including biochemist Michael J. Behe.

He gave a Faraday Institute lecture in April 2009 on "God, Darwin and Design" and appeared on the Today Programme arguing, "The issue of God is an issue on which reasonable people may differ, but I certainly think that it's an over-statement of our scientific knowledge and understanding to argue that science in general, or evolutionary biology in particular, proves in any way that there is no God."

Publications

General books 
 Finding Darwin's God: A Scientist's Search for Common Ground Between God and Evolution (2000, Cliff Street Books ) which argues that acceptance of evolution is compatible with a belief in God.
 Only a Theory : Evolution and the Battle for America's Soul , (2008, Penguin Group) which explores Intelligent Design and the Kitzmiller v. Dover Area School District case along with its implications on teaching science in America
 The Human Instinct: How We Evolved to Have Reason, Consciousness, and Free Will (Simon and Schuster. 2018 ) which explores how humans evolved to develop reason, consciousness, and free will. it was described by David DiSalvo as "an optimist's argument for a refreshed view of human evolution"

Textbooks
Miller is the co-author (with Boston College neurobiologist and marine biologist Joseph Levine) of a major introductory college and high school biology textbook published by Prentice Hall since 1990. The current edition was published in 2010 by Savvas (which now owns Prentice Hall). Initially, Prentice Hall approached Joseph Levine to write the textbook after reading an article he wrote in Smithsonian magazine; Levine, who is a former student of Miller's, then recruited Miller as a co-author. Miller and Levine have also co-written a college-level textbook published by the former D.C. Heath and Company, first edition in 1991, entitled Biology: Discovering Life.

 Miller, K.R. (2018) The Human Instinct: How We Evolved to Have Reason, Consciousness, and Free Will 
 Miller, K.R. (2008) Only a Theory: Evolution and the Battle for America's Soul 
 Miller, K.R. (1999) Finding Darwin's God: A Scientist's Search for Common Ground Between God and Evolution 
 Miller, K.R. and Levine, J. (2002) Biology: The Living Science (various editions of high school textbook)

Honors 
2006 Public Service Award from the American Society for Cell Biology  .

2006 Dwight H. Terry Lectureship at Yale University, delivering his lecture "Darwin, God, and Dover:  What the Collapse of 'Intelligent Design' Means for Science and for Faith in America."

2008 American Association for the Advancement of Science (AAAS) Award for Public Understanding of Science and Technology.

2010 Elected as a Fellow of the Committee for Skeptical Inquiry.

May 2014, Laetare Medal at the University of Notre Dame.

2017,  inaugural St. Albert Award from the Society of Catholic Scientists.

Since 2016, Miller has been listed on the board of directors of the National Center for Science Education. In 2017 he became the president.

See also
 Creation and evolution in public education

References

External links 

 Faculty homepage

Talks
 "Teaching Evolution" Debate on NPR, 19 November 2004
 Firing Line Creation-Evolution Debate, 4 December 1997
 Video Lecture: Ken Miller on Paley in a Test Tube
 Ken Miller at the Dwight H. Terry Lectureship at Yale University, 14 September 2006
 BAM: The Evolution of Ken Miller, November/December 2005
 Interview with Ken Miller, 26 January 2007
 Debate with PZ Myers, 10 May 2007
  at Case Western University
 
 
 Interview on the American Freethought Podcast
Ken Miller's Short Talk: "Evolution-Why it Matters"
Ken Miller's Short Talk: "Defending Evolution"
 Dr. Kenneth Raymond Miller: Professor of Biology, Brown University Interview, part One)  and   part Two 

1948 births
21st-century American biologists
21st-century Roman Catholics
American science writers
Brown University alumni
Brown University faculty
Evolutionary biologists
Harvard University faculty
Living people
People from Rahway, New Jersey
Rahway High School alumni
Science teachers
University of Colorado alumni
American skeptics
Theistic evolutionists
Critics of creationism
Catholics from New Jersey
Writers about religion and science